Frank Mrvan may refer to:

 Frank J. Mrvan (born 1969), U.S. representative from Indiana
 Frank Ed Mrvan Jr. (born 1933), U.S. politician, Indiana state senator